Suppression of the Indian Revolt by the English is a c. 1884 painting by Russian artist Vasily Vereshchagin. The work depicts several Sepoys being executed by being "blown from a gun" in the aftermath of the Indian Rebellion of 1857.

History 
Vereshchagin painted Suppression of the Indian Revolt in 1884 after a trip to British India. Having already visited the Holy Land in the same trip and been inspired by its history, Vereshchagin began to consider producing a series of paintings depicting various forms of executions. One such method of execution was being "blown from a gun" in which the condemned was tied to the muzzle of a cannon and violently dismembered when the cannon was fired. That method was notably used during the suppression of the Indian Rebellion of 1857 about which Vereshchagin heard stories in India.  

Following his return to Europe and his subsequent painting of three execution scenes (later referred to as his "trilogy of executions"), Vereshchagin took his paintings on tour in Britain and the United States. While Suppression was well-received in the United States, the painting was controversial with the British government.

Description 
Vereshchagin, a famous war artist known for his realism, painted Suppression of the Indian Revolt in 1884. The work is anachronistic; it depicts a real event from the 1857 rebellion, but also shows British soldiers wearing contemporary uniforms. The painting was part of Vereshchagin's "trilogy of executions", which also included the works Execution of Conspirators in Russia and Crucifixion by the Romans.

References 

1884 paintings
Lost paintings
Paintings by Vasily Vereshchagin